The 1994 Dumfries and Galloway Regional Council election, the sixth and final election to Dumfries and Galloway Regional Council, was held on 5 May 1994 as part of the wider 1994 Scottish regional elections. The election saw Independents take the most seats, although they lost their overall majority.

Aggregate Results

References

1994 Scottish local elections
May 1994 events in the United Kingdom